2. Liga, 2. liga, 2 liga, II Liga or Druhá liga may refer to:

 Football:
 2. Liga (Slovakia), second-highest football division in Slovakia
 2. Liga (Switzerland), the sixth tier of the Swiss football league system
 2. Liga Interregional, the fifth tier of the Swiss football league system
 2. Liga (Austria), the second tier of the Austrian football league system
 Czech 2. liga, second-highest football division
 2. līga, football league in Latvia
 II liga, the third tier of the Polish football league system
 2. Bundesliga, second-highest football division in Germany
 Ice hockey:
 Swiss 2. Liga (ice hockey)
 2nd Czech Republic Hockey League
 Czechoslovak 2. liga, former ice hockey league in Czechoslovakia
 Slovak 2. Liga, ice hockey league in Slovakia
 Rugby union:
 II liga Rugby, third-highest rugby union league in Poland
 Speedway
Polish Speedway Second League, third-highest motorcycle speedway league in Poland

See also
 II Lyga, football league in Lithuania
 II liiga, football league in Estonia
 Druga Liga (disambiguation)
 Ukrainian Second League
 Liga (disambiguation)
 1. Liga (disambiguation)
 3. Liga (disambiguation)
 4. Liga (disambiguation)
 Liga 2 (disambiguation)
 Liga II, the second-tier league of the Romanian football league system